Isle Abbots (also spelled Isle Abbotts) is a village and civil parish in Somerset, England, around  south-east of Taunton in the South Somerset district. The village had a population of 205 at the 2011 census.

History
The name of the village comes from the River Isle, with the second part coming from its ownership by Muchelney Abbey from Saxon times until the Dissolution of the monasteries in 1538. The manor then passed to the Earl of Hertford.

Bromes House has medieval origins and was restored in 1627. It has been designated as a Grade II* listed building.

In 1645, during the Civil War, Isle Abbots was the scene of a skirmish between parliamentary troops under Edward Massie and Royalist forces under Lord Goring who fought for control of the bridges prior to the Battle of Langport.

Governance
The parish council has responsibility for local issues, including setting an annual precept (local rate) to cover the council's operating costs and producing annual accounts for public scrutiny. The parish council evaluates local planning applications and works with the local police, district council officers, and neighbourhood watch groups on matters of crime, security, and traffic. The parish council's role also includes initiating projects for the maintenance and repair of parish facilities, as well as consulting with the district council on the maintenance, repair, and improvement of highways, drainage, footpaths, public transport, and street cleaning. Conservation matters (including trees and listed buildings) and environmental issues are also the responsibility of the council.

The village falls within the non-metropolitan district of South Somerset, which was formed on 1 April 1974 under the Local Government Act 1972, having previously been part of Langport Rural District. The district council is responsible for local planning and building control, local roads, council housing, environmental health, markets and fairs, refuse collection and recycling, cemeteries and crematoria, leisure services, parks, and tourism.

Somerset County Council is responsible for running the largest and most expensive local services such as education, social services, libraries, main roads, public transport, policing and  fire services, trading standards, waste disposal and strategic planning.

It is also part of the Yeovil county constituency, represented in the House of Commons of the Parliament of the United Kingdom. It elects one Member of Parliament (MP) by the first past the post system of election.

Geography
Isle Abbotts lies between the River Isle and the Fivehead River.

Climate
Along with the rest of South West England, Isle Abbots has a temperate climate which is generally wetter and milder than the rest of the country. Seasonal temperature variation is less extreme than most of the United Kingdom because of the adjacent sea temperatures. In the summer the Azores high pressure affects the south-west of England, however convective cloud sometimes forms inland, reducing the number of hours of sunshine. Annual sunshine rates are slightly less than the regional average of 1,600 hours. In December 1998 there were 20 days without sun recorded at Yeovilton. Most of the rainfall in the south-west is caused by Atlantic depressions or by convection. Most of the rainfall in autumn and winter is caused by the Atlantic depressions, which is when they are most active. In summer, a large proportion of the rainfall is caused by sun heating the ground leading to convection and to showers and thunderstorms. About 8–15 days of snowfall is typical. November to March have the highest mean wind speeds, and June to August have the lightest winds. The predominant wind direction is from the south-west.

Religious sites
The Church of St. Mary the Virgin dates from the 13th century with several restorations since. It has a tower of four stages. The embattled parapet is pierced by quatrefoils, the merlons pierced with lancet openings. The very large corner pinnacles have attached secondary pinnacles, and intermediate pinnacles to each side. The crocketted niches to each face of tower have surviving medieval figures, to west the risen Christ stepping from His sarcophagus, the Blessed Virgin with Bambino, St Peter and St Paul; to south St George, St Catherine, St Margaret; to east St John Baptist, St Clement; to north St Michael. The wealth of architectural detail and sculpture has required specific approaches to the methodology of repair and protection using lime-based materials. The church tower has eight hunky punks depicting a person playing the bagpipes, an oriental lion dog, a goat, a dragon, a Chinese dragon, a primitive dragon, a winged lion and a lion. The church also houses a barrel organ made by Henry Bryceson in about 1835.

There was also a Baptist chapel in the village, which was built in 1815 and restored in 1874. The building is no longer in use and has been sold.

References

External links

Isle Abbotts Village website

Villages in South Somerset
Civil parishes in Somerset